Feu was long the most common form of land tenure in Scotland, as conveyancing in Scots law was dominated by feudalism until the Scottish Parliament passed the Abolition of Feudal Tenure etc. (Scotland) Act 2000. The word is the Scots variant of fee. The English had in 1660 abolished these tenures, with An Act taking away the Court of Wards..., since 1948 known as the Tenures Abolition Act 1660.

History
Prior to 1832, only the vassals of the crown had votes in parliamentary elections for the Scots counties. This favoured subinfeudation as opposed to outright sale of land. This was changed by the Scottish Reform Act 1832, which increased the franchise of males in Scotland from 4,500 to 64,447.

In Orkney and Shetland islands, land is still largely possessed as udal property, a holding derived or handed down from the time when these islands belonged to Norway. Such lands could previously be converted into feus at the will of the proprietor and held from the Crown or the Marquess of Zetland.

At one time the system of conveyancing by which the transfer of feus was effected was curious and complicated, requiring the presence of parties on the land itself and the symbolic transfer of the property (for example, by throwing a shoe onto the earth of the property transferred) together with the registration of various documents. However, legislation since the middle of the 19th century has changed all that.

Various reforms were attempted before feu was eventually abolished by the Abolition of Feudal Tenure etc. (Scotland) Act 2000.

In feu holding, there is a substantial annual payment in money or in kind in return for the enjoyment of the land. The Crown is the first overlord or superior, and land is held of it by crown vassals; they in their turn may feu their land to others, who become their vassals, whilst they themselves are mediate overlords or superiors; this process of sub-infeudation may be repeated to an indefinite extent. The Conveyancing (Scotland) Act 1874 rendered any clause in a disposition against subinfeudation null and void.

Casualties, which are a feature of land held in feu, are certain payments made to the superior, contingent on the happening of certain events. The most important was the payment of an amount equal to one year's feu-duty by a new holder, whether heir or purchaser of the feu. The Conveyancing Act of 1874 abolished casualties in all feus after that date, and power was given to redeem this burden on feus already existing. If the vassal does not pay the feu-duty for two years, the superior, among other remedies, may obtain by legal process a decree of irritancy, whereupon tinsel or forfeiture of the feu follows.

Other types of Scots feudal tenure
There have been other forms of tenure:
Booking is a conveyance peculiar to the burgh of Paisley but does not differ essentially from feu.
Burgage is the system by which land is held in Royal Burghs.
Blench holding is by a nominal payment, as of a penny Scots, or a red rose, often only to be rendered upon demand.
Mortification, an ecclesiastical or other charitable holding in which tenure is granted ad manum mortuum, that is, inalienably and in forfeiture of all the normal superiors' casualties
Ward, the original military holding, was abolished in 1747 (20 G. II. c. 20), as an effect of the rising of 1745.

See also

Fee simple
Fee tail
Feoffee
Trespass for mesne profits

Notes

References

Real property law
Scots law legal terminology
Legal history of Scotland
Scots property law
Feudalism in Scotland